Theodore Frank Appleby (October 10, 1864 – December 15, 1924) was an American Republican Party politician who represented  in the United States House of Representatives from 1921 to 1923. He was the father of Stewart Hoffman Appleby, who also became a congressman from New Jersey.

Biography
Born on October 10, 1864 in Old Bridge, New Jersey, Appleby graduated from Fort Edwards Collegiate Institute in 1885. He became a real estate and insurance businessman. Appleby served as a member of the Asbury Park, New Jersey Board of Education from 1887 to 1897, was a member of the State board of education from 1894 to 1902, was a delegate to the 1896 Republican National Convention, was a member of the city council from 1899 to 1906, served as Mayor of Asbury Park, New Jersey  from 1908 to 1912, and was a member of the Monmouth County Board of Taxation from 1917 to 1920.

He was elected as a Republican to serve as a congressman in the 67th Congress.  He lost the next election, but was reelected at the 69th Congress elections.   He died on December 15, 1924 in Baltimore, Maryland before he could take his seat, and was replaced by his son, Stewart Hoffman Appleby. He was buried in Chestnut Hill Cemetery near Old Bridge in East Brunswick, New Jersey.

References

External links

1864 births
1924 deaths
People from Asbury Park, New Jersey
People from East Brunswick, New Jersey
Mayors of Asbury Park, New Jersey
Republican Party members of the United States House of Representatives from New Jersey